There are over 20,000 Grade II* listed buildings in England.  This page is a list of the fifty Grade II* listed buildings in the district of Mole Valley, for links to similar lists for the other 10 districts of Surrey see Grade II* listed buildings in Surrey.


|}

Notes

References 
English Heritage Images of England

External links

Mole Valley
 Mole Valley
Mole Valley